Carruthers's cisticola (Cisticola carruthersi) is a species of bird in the family Cisticolidae.
It is found in Burundi, Democratic Republic of the Congo, Kenya, Rwanda, Tanzania, and Uganda.
Its natural habitat is swamps.

References

Carruthers's cisticola
Birds of Sub-Saharan Africa
Birds of East Africa
Birds described in 1909
Taxonomy articles created by Polbot